Anna Heringer (born 13 October 1977 in Rosenheim) is a German architect. A proponent of sustainable architecture, she has designed a number of notable buildings including the METI Handmade School in Rudrapur, Bangladesh.

Biography

Heringer grew up in Laufen, Bavaria, in the far south of Germany. She studied architecture at the University of Arts and Industrial Design in Linz, Austria, graduating in 2004. Her interest in Bangladesh began in 1997 when she spent a year carrying out voluntary work there, specially in the NGO Dipshikha, where she learned about sustainable development work. There she also founded her main thought about the most successful strategy, always obtained by trusting the already existing, readily available resources and to make the best out of them instead of becoming dependent on external systems. She has since visited the country at least once a year. In 2004, after completing her university thesis "School: handmade in Bangladesh", she began working on the project itself. After assisting with fund raising, she went on to implement her ideas at Rudrapur in the Dinajpur district of Bangladesh. With the official name of the METI Handmade School, the project was carried out with the assistance of members of the local community. They made use of mud and bamboo, the traditional building materials of the area. The school was completed in 2006 for the NGO Dipshikha. Heringer's other projects include the nearby DESI (Dipshikha Electrical Skill Improvement), a vocational training school for electricians, completed in 2008, and the Training Centre for Sustainability in Marrakech, Morocco, built in 2010. Since 2004, Heringer has lectured widely, both in universities and at conferences, and has undertaken consultancy work. She now lives in Salzburg, Austria.

Anna Heringer's work has been shown at MoMA in New York, la Loge in Brussels, Cité d`architecture and du patrimoine in Paris, the MAM in São Paulo, the Aedes Gallery in Berlin and at the 2010 Venice Biennale.

Anna Heringer has designed some new exciting buildings for the Longquan International Biennale (LIB), which will be launched from the Municipality of Longquan, Zhejiang Province, located approximately 500 km south of Shanghai, PR China. The LIB is an architectural event staged every two years, in which architects of international stature are invited to build habitable buildings in a location of cultural and historical importance. The first LIB, which is due to open in November 2013, invited twelve internationally renowned architects to rise to the challenge.

Projects

Through her projects, Heringer has sought to give local craftsmen and the local community confidence in their use of traditional building methods, preparing them for the future. She also strives to maintain ecological balance, avoiding the detrimental effects of modern architectural methods. Indeed, the Bangladesh projects have been seen as instrumental in opening up a new approach to sustainable building, drawing as they do on local materials and making use of the skills of local workers.

The METI Handmade School, a primary school for 168 students, relies on regional construction and local materials but introduces new approaches for efficiency and structural integrity. As a result of improvements to the bamboo structures and lashing, it was possible to add a second storey to the building. Brick foundations were used to minimize the effects of moisture on the earthen walls. The bricks were made by local craftsmen while the remaining construction work was a collaborative effort by the architects, teachers, students and locals.

DESI, a vocational school for electricians, is of interest not only because it is powered by solar energy but as it is the first mud-built structure in Bangladesh to have indoor plumbing. An extension of the METI project, it called on the services of local students and craftsmen in the hope that the skills they learnt would be reapplied in the region. While local materials, mainly mud and bamboo, were used, structural stability and viability were improved with a masonry foundation and damp-proofing. No machinery was used in the construction apart from making use of cows for mixing the earth, water and rice straw. The building houses two classrooms, two apartments for the instructors with bathroom and toilets, and includes a student bathroom with toilets and sinks on the ground floor. Plumbing additions are unusual in mud buildings as they normally require concrete or masonry structures.

The Training Center for Sustainable Construction in Chwiter, Marrakesh, again draws on local craftsmanship and materials, in this case earth, wood and ceramics. The project has been seen as having the potential to become a model for Morocco and beyond.

She has designed the Anandaloy Building, a combined center for people with disabilities and textile studio in northern Bangladesh.

Awards

 Aga Khan Award for Architecture (2007) for the METI School.
 Bronze for Africa and Middle East, Regional Holcim Awards competition 2011, for the Training Center in Marrakesh.
 Global Award for Sustainable Architecture (2011).
Obel Award for the Anandaloy Building.

See also
Women in architecture

References

External links
https://www.anna-heringer.com/
https://www.gsd.harvard.edu/2018/10/talking-practice-anna-heringer/

1977 births
21st-century German architects
People from Rosenheim
German women architects
Living people
Bavarian architects
21st-century German women